Richard Whatcoat (February 23, 1736 – July 4, 1806) was the third bishop of the American Methodist Episcopal Church.

Early life
Whatcoat was born in Quinton Gloucestershire, England. His mother and father were Charles and Mary Whatcoat. He considered himself fortunate to be in Church of England parish where the Minister, the Reverend Samuel Taylor, was "a converted man". He believed his mother to be converted. His father died when he was young leaving his wife with two sons and three daughters. When he was thirteen Whatcoat was apprenticed to Mr Joseph Jones who lived in Birmingham, shortly after moving to Darlaston in Staffordshire.

Whatcoat's conversion

After completing his apprenticeship at the age of twenty-one, in 1757, he moved to nearby Wednesbury. There he began attending Methodist meetings and was challenged by their preaching which he described as "light and power to my soul". On the third of September 1758 he underwent a classic Evangelical conversion. He was reading his Bible when he came across verse 16 in Romans chapter eight"The Spirit itself beareth witness with our Spirit, that we are children of God". Whatcoat claimed that in that moment "my darkness was removed, and the Spirit did bear witness with my Spirit, that I was a child of God. In the same instant I was filled with unspeakable peace and joy in believing: all fear of death, judgement, and hell, suddenly vanished."

Whatcoat's spiritual journey continued and on the 28 March 1761 he understood that Grace was a free gift of God "my soul was drawn out and engaged in a manner it never was before. Suddenly I was stripped of all but love". He then spent the rest of his time in Wednesbury serving as a band leader, class leader and society steward amongst the growing Methodist community in the town.

Methodism in Wednesbury

Methodism in Wednesbury at that time was recovering from the severe persecutions during the 1743 and 1744 anti-Methodist riots. Serious incidents continued across the West Midlands well into the 1760s. The Methodist community which met at Wednesbury included the young Francis Asbury, with whom Whatcoat developed a lifelong friendship, and William Legge the 2nd Earl of Dartmouth.

Circuit work in Great Britain and Ireland

Whatcoat wanted to develop his ministry and resolved to go full-time in 1769. John Pawson proposed him at that year's Methodist Conference and he was accepted as a probationer, initially stationed at Oxford. His subsequent stations were:
1770 Bedford, England; 1771 Inniskillen, Ireland; 1772 Armah, Ireland (during much of this stationing he was seriously ill); 1773 Pembrook, Wales; 1774 Brecknock, Wales; 1776 Launceston, Cornwall, England; 1777 St. Austle, Cornwall, England; 1778 Salisbury, Wiltshire, England; 1780 Northampton, England; 1781 Canterbury, Kent, England; 1782 Lynn, Norfolk, England; 1783 Norwich, Norfolk, England.

Travels to America

Methodism was originally conceived as a society within the Church of England, not a separate denomination. During the War of Independence the Church of England in the United States collapsed as most of the clergy left. This denied Methodist societies access to the sacraments of baptism and holy communion. In 1784 John Wesley remedied the situation by himself ordaining Francis Asbury in absentia and Thomas Coke, appointing them joint superintendents of the work in the new United States. Coke, Thomas Vasey and Whatcoat, who had been appointed a deacon, set out to America to consecrate Asbury at Baltimore on Christmas Day of that year Three years later Coke and Asbury assumed the title "Bishop", which did not please John Wesley.

Coke, Vasey and Whatcoat set out for New York from Bristol on the 28th September 1784. The ship was called the "Four Friends" and during the first four days they were sea sick. They soon settled into a routine of prayers each morning and evening, with two preaching services on Sundays. They spent the evening reading up on the lives of preachers, saints, and divinity. At one point a fifteen-foot whale accompanied the ship, on another occasion they caught and ate a dolphin. The wind was against them and the journey was difficult with two nights of thunder and lightning. The arrived in New York six weeks and thousand miles later on 3 November 1784.

Ministry in America

Whatcoat threw himself wholeheartedly into the itinerant Methodist ministry across the thirteen states. He accompanied Francis Asbury on long missionary journeys taking him too many parts of the new country. Frequently they were in danger from Native Americans. Him and Asbury would often share the preaching, with one speaking in the morning, and the other, in the afternoon. He did not keep a journal as Asbury had done but Asbury mentions Whatcoat on many occasions. His short auto-biography, published after his death records many long journeys and preaching engagements.

At the Annual Methodist Conference held in Baltimore, Maryland in May 1800, Whatcoat was elected the third Bishop of the new church. "We had a most blessed time", he recalled, "and much preaching and fervent prayers, and strong exhortation through the city, while the high praises of a gracious God reverberated from street to street, house to house, which greatly alarmed the citizens. It was thought that not less than two hundred were converted during the sitting of the conference."

During the last few years of his ministry Whatcoat continued to travel and preach even though he was often unwell, by then he was in his late sixties. In July 1805 he wrote "Notwithstanding my infirm state of body, through the blessing of God. I have been able to travel three thousand four hundred and sixteen miles the last twelve month.....I have great reason to bless God, who has preserved me these many years as an itinerant preacher, during which he have delivered me from many afflictions of body and mind"

By the time of his death in 1806 he had been in itinerant ministry for 37 years, 22 of them in the United States. He never returned to England and never married.

Bibliography

Phœbus,William, Ed, Memoirs of the Rev. Richard Whatcoat, Late Bishop of the Methodist Episcopal Church, New York, 1828
Hallam, David J.A., Eliza Asbury: her cottage and her son, Studley 2003
Clarke, E.T., Manning Potts, T., Payton, Jacob S., Editors The Journal and Letters of Francis Asbury, Vols. 1-3, Nashville and London, 1958
The life of R. W. written by himself in : Jackson (Thomas) Wesleyan Minister. The lives of early Methodist Preachers, etc. Vol. 3. 1837, etc. 12º

See also
List of bishops of the United Methodist Church

References

1736 births
1806 deaths
American Methodist Episcopal bishops
Bishops of the Methodist Episcopal Church
Methodist missionaries in the United States
Converts to Methodism from Anglicanism
English Methodist missionaries
English emigrants to British North America
History of Methodism in the United States
People from Gloucestershire
Deaths from dysentery
Infectious disease deaths in Delaware
18th-century Methodist bishops
19th-century Methodist bishops
English Methodists